The London Stereoscopic and Photographic Company was founded in 1854 by George Swan Nottage and Howard John Kennard. Known initially as the London Stereoscope Company, in 1856 it changed its name to the London Stereoscopic Company, then in May 1859, became the London Stereoscopic and Photographic Company. For most purposes, however, it was (and still is) referred to as the London Stereoscopic Company (LSC). 

The firm appears to have been based originally at 313 Oxford Street, with an agent, William Williams, at 29 Moorgate Street. It soon opened its  own branch in the City of London at 54 Cheapside, which is first recorded in 1856. The Oxford Street store relocated to 108–110 Regent Street in 1866–1867.

The London Stereoscopic Company was dissolved in 1922, although a business bearing the same name was established in 2005, championned by rock guitarist Brian May.

Photographers 
Its principal photographer was William England and also featured Thomas Richard Williams.
Edward Pocock 1843–1905.  Edward Pocock 'an artist about to travel for the same Company to take photographs and (make) sketches of places of interest for publication in England. Date lacking but witnessed by Sir Thomas White, Lord Mayor of London.

Prints from Robert Howlett's photographs were published after his death in 1859.

Notes

References

External links

 London Stereoscopic Company revival website
London Stereoscopic Company collection at the National Portrait Gallery
 London Stereoscopic and Photographic Company collection at the Royal Academy
 LSC at University of Oregon
 LSC at Getty Images

Photography companies of England
Defunct companies based in London
Stereoscopy
Mass media companies established in the 1850s
British companies established in 1854
1854 establishments in England
1922 disestablishments in England
Defunct photography companies
British companies disestablished in 1922